Zvíkovské Podhradí is a municipality and village in Písek District in the South Bohemian Region of the Czech Republic. It has about 200 inhabitants.

Geography
Zvíkovské Podhradí lies at the confluence of the rivers Vltava and Otava.

Sights

Zvíkovské Podhradí is known for the medieval Zvíkov Castle, which gave it its name (which means "the area under Zvíkov Castle").

References

External links

Villages in Písek District